RIF or Rif may refer to:

Arts and entertainment 
 Renju International Federation, Renju is the professional variant of the board game Gomoku
 R.I.F., a 2011 film

Computing 
 Requirements Interchange Format, XML file format that can be used to exchange requirements
 Routing information field, a source route-related field in the token ring network frame header
 Rule Interchange Format, a W3C recommendation-track effort
 Russian Internet Forum

Military 
 Reconnaissance in force, a type of military operation used specifically to probe an enemy's disposition
 The Royal Irish Fusiliers (Princess Victoria's), an infantry regiment of the British Army, raised in 1881
 Realistic Imitation Firearm, a replica that realistically portrays a firearm; see Legal issues in airsoft
 R-39 Rif, Soviet and Russian submarine-launched ballistic missile

People 
 Isaac Alfasi (1013–1103), Rabbi Isaac ben Jacob Alfasi (1013—1103), was a Talmudist and posek
 Riff languages, a grouping of languages spoken in the Rif area
 Riffian people, inhabitants of the Rif Region

Places 
 Rif (sandbank), in the Netherlands
 Rif, a mountain chain and a region in Morocco
 The Republic of the Rif, a short-lived republic in the region which fought against Spanish rule.
 Rif, Iceland, in the municipality of Snæfellsbær
 Rif Airport

Science 
 Retrieval-induced forgetting, a phenomenon in memory
 Rif (GTPase), small signalling G protein
 Rifampicin, the antibiotic
 Right iliac fossa, part of the surface of the human abdomen
 The initials on bars of soap purported to have been made of human fat in World War II

Other uses 
 Reading Is Fundamental, an organization promoting children's literacy
 Reduction in Force, a large-scale ending of employment
 Riff, a brief relaxed musical phrase repeated over changing melodies

See also
Riff (disambiguation)
Reef (disambiguation)